Blue Wings AG was a charter airline based in Germany, focusing on serving Turkey, the Middle East and Russia from its base at Düsseldorf Airport. The headquarters were located on the airport property.

History

Early years and growth
Blue Wings was established in 2002, received the AOC on 27 June 2003 and started operations in July of the same year. It initially operated charter flights from Düsseldorf using a wet-leased Airbus A320. In June 2006, the Russian National Reserve Corporation (NRC) acquired a 48 percent shareholding through its Zürich based subsidiary Alpstream AG, which was intended to lead to a close co-operation between Blue Wings and Red Wings Airlines, also belonging to NRC.

On 6 October 2006, Blue Wings signed a purchase agreement with JetBlue Airways for five second-hand Airbus A320-200 aircraft. For cost-saving reasons, Blue Wings adopted a nearly identical color scheme compared to JetBlue. On 17 October of the same year, another order - this time for 16 new Airbus A320 and 4 Airbus A321 was signed, and subsequently announced during the Farnborough Air Show of the same year.

Development since 2009 and closure
On 30 December 2009, the Federal Office for Civil Aviation of Germany revoked the operating license of Blue Wings because of solvency fears, forcing the airline to shut down all operations. Blue Wings was saved for once on 23 April of the same year, when it was announced that Elite Aviation, a VIP charter airline from Abu Dhabi, had signed a charter agreement with Blue Wings. Subsequently, the license was reinstated on 5 May.

On 5 August 2009, it was announced that Iraqi Airways, Iraq's national airline, had signed a contract to lease three Blue Wings Airbus A320-232, which were used on European routes.

On 13 January 2010, Blue Wings ceased all operations, filing bankruptcy due to the financial crisis which had led to a pull-out of investors. The airline's corporate head office was located in Düsseldorf, at Düsseldorf Airport. Before closure it was in Terminal A. Previously it was in Hangar 8 at the same airport.

Destinations 

Blue Wings operated the following international scheduled destinations in November 2011:

Africa

Marrakech - Marrakech-Menara Airport
Agadir - Agadir–Al Massira Airport

Monastir - Habib Bourguiba International Airport

Asia

Karaganda - Sary-Arka Airport

Beirut - Beirut Rafic Hariri International Airport

Europe

Berlin - Berlin Schönefeld Airport
Düsseldorf - Düsseldorf Airport Base
Hamburg - Hamburg Airport focus city
Karlsruhe/Baden-Baden - Karlsruhe/Baden-Baden Airport
Leipzig/Halle - Leipzig/Halle Airport
Münster/Osnabrück - Münster Osnabrück International Airport

Athens - Athens International Airport
Crete - Heraklion International Airport
Corfu - Corfu International Airport

Alghero - Alghero-Fertilia Airport
Rome - Rome Ciampino Airport

Faro - Faro Airport
Madeira - Funchal Airport

Moscow - Sheremetyevo International Airport

Barcelona - El Prat Airport
Gran Canaria - Gran Canaria Airport
Tenerife - Reina Sofia Airport
Palma de Mallorca - Palma de Mallorca Airport
Ibiza - Ibiza Airport
Málaga - Málaga Airport

Kyiv - Boryspil International Airport

Izmir - Adnan Menderes International Airport
Antalya - Antalya Airport
Samsun - Çarşamba Airport

Fleet
The Blue Wings fleet consisted of the following aircraft (at 25 November 2012):

References

External links

Blue Wings (Archive, 2009)
Blue Wings (Archive, 2005-2007)
Blue Wings  (Archive)

Defunct airlines of Germany
Airlines established in 2002
Airlines disestablished in 2012
2002 establishments in Germany
German companies disestablished in 2010
German companies established in 2002